Mian Chak-e Talkor (also Romanized as Mīān Chāk-e Talkor; also known as Mīān Do Chāk) is a village in Qilab Rural District, Alvar-e Garmsiri District, Andimeshk County, Khuzestan Province, Iran. At the 2006 census, its population was 29, in 7 families.

References 

Populated places in Andimeshk County